Mohamed Wahid Tawakol (born 1990 in Tanta) is an Egyptian footballer who plays as a striker.

On 9 September 2011, Tawakol scored Svetkavitsa's first-ever A PFG goal, in a 4–1 away loss against Lokomotiv Sofia.

References

External links

1990 births
Living people
Egyptian footballers
Egyptian expatriate footballers
PFC Svetkavitsa players
Expatriate footballers in Bulgaria
First Professional Football League (Bulgaria) players
People from Tanta
Association football forwards